Yevgeniya Vyacheslavovna Koshelnikova Sukhoruchenkova (also transliterated as Evgenia Sukhoruchenkova) (born 25 September 1986 in Stavropol) is a Russian professional triathlete, member of the Russian National Team (Duathlon), decorated with the Russian title Master of Sports (Мастер спорта), both U23 Duathlon European Champion and U23 Duathlon World Champion of the year 2009, and Russian Elite Aquathlon Champion 2011.
In the Russian Cup of the year 2009 she placed fifth, sharing this position with Natalia Shliakhtenko.

Sukhoruchenkova is married with the Russian triathlete Nikolay Sukhoruchenkov (Николай Сухорученков) from Saint Petersburg and the ITU has replaced her maiden name, Koshelnikova, with her new family name, Sukhoruchenkova, also in result lists dating back to the time before her marriage. In Russian sources, however, up to 2008 she is named Koshelnikova (Кошельникова) and since 2009 the name form varies. Some media use the double name Кошельникова Сухорученкова, others choose one of her family names. The Russian Triathlon Federation has both forms. On its Profile Page she is called Кошельникова, in various official result lists, however, she is listed as Сухорученкова.

At various World Military Triathlon Championships Sukhoruchenkova was successful, too. In Hyderabad (2007) she won the bronze medal, in Satenas (2006) and Otepää (2008) she won the gold and the silver medal respectively in the team ranking, placing 10th and 9th in the individual ranking.

In Russia, Sukhoruchenkova represents the Stavropol High Performance Centre СУОР (Училище Олимпийского резерва Ставрополь).

ITU Competitions 
In the nineyears from 2004 to 2012, Sukhoruchenkova took part in 49 ITU competitions and achieved 22 top ten positions.
At her first ITU competition of the season 2011, Sukhoruchenkova won the gold medal at the Pan American Cup in Santiago. At the end of the season 2012, she won two gold medals at European Cup triathlons.
The following list is based upon the official ITU rankings and the Athlete's Profile Page. Unless indicated otherwise, the following events are triathlons (Olympic Distance) and belong to the Elite category.

BG = the sponsor British Gas · DNF = did not finish · DNS = did not start

External links 
 Sukhoruchenkova’s official ITU Profile Page
 Sukhoruchenkova’s Profile Page on the Homepage of the Russian Triathlon Federation; in Russian

Notes 

1986 births
Living people
Sportspeople from Stavropol
Russian female triathletes